Giuseppe Tonucci (9 March 1938 – 11 October 1988) was an Italian cyclist. He competed in the individual road race at the 1960 Summer Olympics.

References

External links
 

1938 births
1988 deaths
Italian male cyclists
Olympic cyclists of Italy
Cyclists at the 1960 Summer Olympics
People from Fano
Cyclists from Marche
Sportspeople from the Province of Pesaro and Urbino